The San Francisco Center for the Book (SFCB) is a non-profit organization founded in 1996 by Mary Austin and Kathleen Burch in San Francisco, California in the United States.  The first center of its kind on the West Coast, SFCB was modeled after two similar organizations, The Center for Book Arts in New York City and the Minnesota Center for Book Arts in Minneapolis.

In their mission statement, SFCB is declared as "a center of inspiration for the book arts world, featuring the art & craft of letterpress printing, bookbinding, and artists' book making."

Currently, SFCB offers over 300 workshops and 44 free events a year. In addition to workshops and events, they have a thriving exhibition program, Small Plates program, and collaborate with many local nonprofits, museums, and libraries. They also host special visits and hands-on demonstrations for students of all ages, teachers, librarians, corporate team building, collectors, visiting printers, artists, writers, and designers.

History
The San Francisco Center for the Book was co-founded by Mary Austin and Kathleen Burch, who recognized a growing need in San Francisco and the Bay Area for a facility specifically designed and equipped for the book arts. The first center of its kind on the West Coast, SFCB was incorporated in March 1996 as a 501(c)3 non-profit organization. The grand opening on July 30, 1996, attracted an overflow crowd of more than 400 people. From their first season, with 64 students in a dozen classes, they have grown to more than 300 classes and nearly 2,000 per year. In early 2013, they moved to a  space, including a large print studio, exhibition gallery, a platemaking lab, a separate bindery, and administrative offices.

Workshops
SFCB offers more than 300 workshops each year in three broad categories: Printing, Binding, and Related Arts. Registration begins as soon as each trimester's workshops are announced, and continues throughout the trimester. Students are encouraged to register early, as class size is limited and workshops are filled on a first-come, first-served basis.

Events
The San Francisco Center for the Book offers a wealth of public programs, many of which are free. Events create opportunities for the community to cultivate ties with professional and amateur book artists, writers and scholars; share the pleasures of letterpress printing, bookbinding, letterforms and artists' books with a broader audience; and create an exciting dialogue between makers, collectors, and connoisseurs.

Roadworks: A Steamroller Printing Festival is a day-long annual street fair hosted by SFCB showcasing printmaking and the art of the book. Using seven-ton and 12-ton antique steamrollers, a team of artists and printers print large-scale linoleum carved block prints. In addition to the steamroller printing centerpiece, there are artists, vendors, and organizations presenting an assortment of fine and affordable wares. In 2016, Roadworks attracted more than 3,000 attendees.

Exhibitions
SFCB has mounted over 70 book arts related exhibitions in the Austin Burch Gallery since its inception in 2006, ranging from group works to individual retrospectives and featuring local, nation, and international book artists. Named for the co-founders Mary Austin and Kathleen Burch, this  exhibition space is adjacent to the print and bindery studios, creating the perfect environment for visitors to see both works in progress and fully realized art work. They have also presented exhibitions at off-site venues including the Commonwealth Club, ODC/Dance at Project Artaud, and the Marin Community Center.

In 2010, they hosted Restless Dust: A Ghost Walk with Darwin and Los Angeles Loteria: An Exploration of Identity. 2011 brought the exhibition Blankets Impressions: Brad Freeman, Clifton Meador, and the Offset Printed Artist's Book,''  profiling two nationally prominent book artists whose work is rarely seen on the West Coast. SFCB's 15th Anniversary Exhibition opened on September 15, 2011.

The first exhibition of 2012 was "Paper Space: Kota Ezawa," with work by 2011 Imprint Artist in Residence Kota Ezawa, coinciding with an exhibition of new work by the artist at Haines Gallery, San Francisco. "Left to Chance: The Accidental Book Art," curated by Hanna Regev, opens February 17, 2012.

Community
As a non-profit organization, SFCB has maintained an essential role in providing for the local arts community. It offers a number of volunteering opportunities year-round as well as internships, and has maintained a book arts youth education program since 1996. Field trips focus primarily on providing workshops for K-12 and college students, adults, and classroom teachers. They also offer half and full day corporate activity workshops. The facility serves as a venue for the activities of other book arts organizations in the Bay Area, including the Pacific Center for the Book Arts and The Hand Bookbinders of California.

Imprint Publications
The Imprint of SFCB is the publishing arm of the San Francisco Center for the Book, and a home for a selected group of artists to learn the art and craft of the handmade book. The Imprint facilitates SFCB's mission of promoting the traditional book arts alongside exploration of experimental forms and techniques through two ongoing letterpress-based projects: the Artist in Residence Program and the Small Plates Edition Series.

Artist in Residence Program
The Imprint of the SFCB's Artist in Residence Program was initiated in 2005. The program provides emerging and established artists with technical and studio support to create handmade limited-edition books. Participants are chosen from a creative community of San Francisco Bay Area artists ranging from those in the fine arts and multi-media to photographers, poets and writers. The goal of the Artist in Residency is to raise awareness of book arts as a vital genre in contemporary art, to bring fresh perspectives to the field, and to support artists in their vocation. Residency artists share their skills, processes and perspective through public lectures, workshops and by welcoming volunteer participation in the production of their editions which are printed and bound at the SFCB. The Residency hosts one artist (or artist team) per year, and concludes in December with a signed and numbered artist's book project issued in trade edition and deluxe edition versions. The artist-in-residency program is made possible through book sales, donations and artist sponsorships.
Past Artists in Residence include: Michael Bartalos, Nora Pauwels and John DeMerritt, Amy Franceshini and Michael Swaine, Kota Ezawa, Gail Wight, Ala Ebtekar, and Nigel Poor. 
SFCB's 2012 Imprint Artist in Residence is Paolo Salvagione.

Small Plates Edition Series
Small Plates is a series of 4" square letterpress-printed books issued in editions of 100 signed and numbered copies each. Released on a periodic basis, these editions feature creative interplay between word, image and book structure. Invited participants range from emerging to established artists, including at least one Bay Area art student per year. Small Plates book production is a collaborative process that was designed to benefit the artist, the SFCB and the wider community. The program is made possible through book sales, donations and artist sponsorships.

Facilities
SFCB offers daytime Studio Rental (Monday-Friday 10am-5pm) and evening Open Print Studio (designed evenings 5-10pm) for those who qualify.

References

External links
 The San Francisco Center for the Book website
 S.F. Center for the Book brings letterpress alive

Book arts
Non-profit organizations based in San Francisco
Arts organizations established in 1996
Art in San Francisco